Media is the first studio album by new wave revivalists The Faint. Formally known as Norman Bailer, this is the first album under the Faint name. It was released on March 24, 1998.  A clear style change can be seen after this album's release, moving from a more Post-hardcore influenced style to new wave.

This album is the 21st release of Saddle Creek Records.

Track listing
 "Syntax Lies" – 3:39
 "Some Incriminating Photographs" – 3:09
 "As the Doctor Talks" – 3:16
 "Tandem: City to City" – 2:13
 "Repertoire of Uncommon Depth" – 3:42
 "Typing: 1974-2048" – 2:00
 "Lullaby for the..." – 0:54
 "Acting; On Campus Television" – 2:34
 "<===> (Getting/Giving The Lock)" – 2:49 (Shown with 2 arrow icons on the cd track list)
 "Amorous in Bauhaus Fashion" – 3:01
 "There's Something Not As Valid When the Scenery Is a Postcard" – 2:33
 "An Allusion Passes Through the Bar" – 6:57
 "Defy the Ailments" (Hidden track) – 2:05

External links
The Faint official website
Saddle Creek Records

1998 debut albums
The Faint albums
Saddle Creek Records albums